Ivar Sven Lennart "Kovan" Sjölin (28 September 1918 – 10 September 1992) was a Swedish freestyle wrestler who won a silver medal in the featherweight division at the 1948 Olympics.

References

External links
 

1918 births
1992 deaths
Olympic wrestlers of Sweden
Wrestlers at the 1948 Summer Olympics
Swedish male sport wrestlers
Olympic silver medalists for Sweden
Olympic medalists in wrestling
Medalists at the 1948 Summer Olympics
People from Lidköping Municipality
Sportspeople from Västra Götaland County
20th-century Swedish people